Scopula latitans is a moth of the  family Geometridae. It is found in Angola, the Democratic Republic of Congo, Guinea, Kenya, Malawi, South Africa, Tanzania, Gambia and Zimbabwe.

References

latitans
Lepidoptera of Angola
Lepidoptera of the Democratic Republic of the Congo
Fauna of the Gambia
Lepidoptera of Tanzania
Lepidoptera of West Africa
Lepidoptera of Zimbabwe
Moths of Sub-Saharan Africa
Moths described in 1920